Yosef Dov Soloveitchik (born 1820 in Nesvizh, Minsk Governorate, Russian Empire; died May 1, 1892 in Brest-Litovsk, Grodno Governorate, Russian Empire) was the author of Beis Halevi, by which name he is better known among Talmudic scholars. He was the great-grandson of Chaim Volozhin.

Early years
Yosef Dov Soloveitchik was born to Rivka, a granddaughter of Chaim Volozhin. His father was Yitschok Ze'ev, descendant of Simcha Rappaport.

In his youth, Soloveitchik lived in Brod. One anecdote illustrates his early mastery of rabbinic learning. Shlomo Kluger, the rabbi of Brod, enjoyed engaging in Talmud studies with him. When Soloveitchik was about to leave Brod, Kluger is reputed to have said to him, “You have always resolved my kushyos (difficult Talmudic questions). But I have one difficulty you cannot resolve. How will I manage to part from you?”

Rosh yeshiva
Soloveitchik was reputed to have one of the great minds of his time. In 1854, he was considered a candidate for rosh yeshiva of Volozhin yeshiva, over Naftali Zvi Yehuda Berlin. During this time he would lead the Yeshiva alongside the Netziv. However, Berlin would ultimately be selected for the position, resulting in Soloveitchik relocating to Brisk.

Rabbinate
In 1865, Soloveitchik became rabbi of Slutsk. After assuming this position, he went to visit the cheder classes where the young boys received their education. When he observed the impoverished state of many children, he arranged for lunches to be served there, paid for by the community. His son, Chaim Soloveitchik, once said that while he himself responded to peoples’ needs, his father went further and discovered on his own what their needs were. His pupils in Slutsk included Joseph Rosen, later to gain fame as "the Rogatchover Gaon", and Zalman Sender Shapiro.

He was a fierce opponent of the Maskilim, as a result of which he left Slutsk in 1874. He then moved to Warsaw where he lived in poverty. When the rabbi of Brisk, Yehoshua Leib Diskin left for the Land of Israel in 1877, Soloveitchik was offered the rabbinate of Brisk. He continued to hold that position until his death in 1892, when he was succeeded by his son Chaim Soloveitchik. He is buried in Brest, Belarus.

Works
Soloveitchik composed works on Jewish law (responsa) called Shu"t Beis Halevi, as well as a commentary on the first book and part of the second book of the Bible (Beis Halevi al Hatorah).

Family tree

Soloveitchik was the great-grandfather of the eponymous Joseph B. Soloveitchik and another descendant, Berel Soloveitchik who moved to Israel, both of whom are also known as "Yosef Dov Soloveitchik."

See also
 Brisk yeshivas and methods.

References

 Rabbis of Brisk 

1820 births
1892 deaths
People from Nesvizh
People from Slutsky Uyezd
Belarusian Orthodox rabbis
Bible commentators
Soloveitchik rabbinic dynasty
Anti-Zionist Orthodox rabbis
Volozhin rosh yeshivas
19th-century rabbis from the Russian Empire